William James Ballantine  (15 April 1937 – 1 November 2015) was a British-born New Zealand marine biologist. He has been called the "father of marine conservation in New Zealand".

Biography
Born in Leicester, England, on 15 April 1937, Ballantine was awarded an MA from Downing College, Cambridge and a PhD from Queen Mary College, University of London. His thesis was entitled The population dynamics of Patella vulgata and other limpets. He emigrated to New Zealand in 1964 when he was appointed the inaugural director of the University of Auckland's Leigh Marine Laboratory. The Marine Reserves Act 1971 was the brainchild of Ballantine, and he initiated a "no take" marine reserve at Leigh. Both of these initiatives were one of the first to be initiated in the world.  Minister of Conservation Nick Smith described him as the "father of marine conservation in New Zealand.

Ballantine died at Auckland City Hospital on 1 November 2015; his wife Dulcie had predeceased him.

Honours and awards
In 1990 Ballantine was awarded the New Zealand 1990 Commemoration Medal. In the 1994 New Year Honours, he was appointed a Member of the Order of the British Empire, for services to marine biology and conservation. He was awarded the Goldman Environmental Prize in 1996, for his work on marine conservation and with New Zealand's Marine Reserve Act''. In the 2006 Queen's Birthday Honours, Ballantine was made a Companion of the Queen's Service Order, for public services.

References 

1937 births
2015 deaths
Alumni of Downing College, Cambridge
Alumni of Queen Mary University of London
English environmentalists
New Zealand marine biologists
New Zealand environmentalists
Companions of the Queen's Service Order
New Zealand Members of the Order of the British Empire
People from Leicester
English emigrants to New Zealand
Academic staff of the University of Auckland
Goldman Environmental Prize awardees
20th-century New Zealand zoologists